Kees Heemskerk (born 2 May 1991) is a Dutch professional footballer who plays as a goalkeeper and is currently without a club.

External links
 
 

1991 births
Living people
Dutch footballers
RKC Waalwijk players
FC Den Bosch players
Eerste Divisie players
Footballers from Zaanstad
Association football goalkeepers